Jim & Jesse were an American bluegrass music duo composed of brothers Jim McReynolds (February 13, 1927 – December 31, 2002) and Jesse McReynolds (born July 9, 1929). The two were born and raised in Carfax, a community near Coeburn, Virginia, United States. Their grandfather, Charles McReynolds, had led the band "The Bull Mountain Moonshiners", who recorded at the Bristol Sessions in 1927.

Line-up
Jesse played the mandolin with a unique, self-invented "crosspicking" and "split-string" playing method, and Jim sang as a high tenor and played guitar. They played with their backing band, The Virginia Boys, consisting of a five-string banjo, fiddle, and bass player. The Virginia Boys have included musicians such as fiddler Vassar Clements, banjo player Allen Shelton, Mike Scott, Vic Jordan, Bobby Thompson, Carl Jackson, fiddler Jimmy Buchanan, Glen Duncan, Jesse's oldest son, the late Keith McReynolds, Randall Franks, and many more.

Since the death of his brother Jim, Jesse has continued to perform with their Virginia Boys band. He still performs in the bluegrass music tradition, but has added other genres of music to his repertoire, including Chuck Berry and Grateful Dead songs. Jesse participated in a 2010 tribute to Jerry Garcia and Robert Hunter titled Jesse McReynolds & Friends Tribute to Jerry Garcia and Robert Hunter: Songs of the Grateful Dead, released on Woodstock Records. It features Garcia's friends David Nelson and Sandy Rothman, along with Stu Allen, of the present Jerry Garcia Acoustic Band. 
 
Jesse's present band line-up includes Keith's son, Garrett McReynolds, as tenor singer/rhythm guitarist. On special occasions, Jesse takes out the historic fiddle his grandfather played on the Bristol Sessions, and lets his grandson Luke McKnight do the cross-picking that Jesse created. Rounding out the group is Travis Wetzel on fiddle, Gary Reece on banjo, and Larry Carney on guitar.

Recordings
In 1952, Jim & Jesse were signed to their first major label, Capitol Records. They have also recorded for Columbia Records, Epic Records, and Opryland USA. They also released under their own Old Dominion record label. In 1960, their first single for Columbia was "The Flame of Love" backed by "Gosh I Miss You All the Time". Their other classic songs include "Cotton Mill Man", "Diesel on My Tail", "Are You Missing Me", and "Paradise".

In the late 1950s and early 1960s, Jim and Jesse starred on the live radio show, the Suwannee River Jamboree, broadcast on Saturday nights from Live Oak, Florida, on WNER radio. The show was also syndicated throughout the Southeastern United States. The brothers replaced the Stanley Brothers on the show. They left when Martha White began using the duo as a sponsor.

On March 2, 1964, they were invited to join the Grand Ole Opry after making several appearances as guest performers, and they moved to Gallatin, Tennessee, later that year.

Jim and Jesse joined producers Randall Franks and Alan Autry for the In the Heat of the Night cast album Christmas Time's A-Comin''', performing the title song with the cast. The album became one of the most popular Christmas releases of 1991 and 1992 with Southern retailers. Jesse also added his mandolin talents to a vocal performance of "Bring a Torch Jeanette Isabella" by actor Carroll O'Connor.

Jesse continues to perform at numerous folk festivals representing the traditional arts and some of his new styles.

Personal lives
In 2002, both brothers were diagnosed with different types of cancer. Jesse's battle was successful, but Jim died in 2002 at the age of 75, ending the longest active professional brother duet in country music history - 55 years.

Jesse has carried on the Jim & Jesse tradition and continues to play the Grand Ole Opry and special dates with his band, as well as being a guest with other groups. He still lives in Gallatin, Tennessee.

Awards and honors
The duo's honors include induction into the Country Music Hall of Fame's "Walkway of Stars", the Virginia Country Music Hall of Fame, the International Bluegrass Music Association's Hall of Honor, and Bill Monroe's Bluegrass Hall of Fame. Individually and collectively they were nominated for several Grammy Awards. They also received a National Heritage Fellowship from the National Endowment for the Arts, presented by Hillary Clinton and Jane Alexander at The White House on September 23, 1997.

In 2004, Jesse was honored with a nomination by the International Bluegrass Music Association for his project Bending the Rules'' as Instrumental Recording of the Year.

Discography

Albums

Singles

References

External links

Podcast of Jim and Jesse's performance at the 1998 Florida Folk Festival. There is also a podcast of the Suwannee River Jamboree. Made available for public use by the State Archives of Florida.
Live version of "Gosh I Miss You All the Time" from the 1998 Florida Folk Festival. Made available for public use by the State Archives of Florida.
2010 performance of Okeechobee Wind Music City Roots
Jesse McReynolds Interview NAMM Oral History Library (2011)

American bluegrass music groups
Country music groups from Virginia
Starday Records artists
Grand Ole Opry members
Musical groups established in 1945
Musical groups disestablished in 2002
1945 establishments in Virginia
2002 disestablishments in the United States
People from Coeburn, Virginia
National Heritage Fellowship winners